Epistemic modality is a sub-type of linguistic modality that encompasses knowledge, belief, or credence in a proposition. Epistemic modality is exemplified by the English modals may, might, must. However, it occurs cross-linguistically, encoded in a wide variety of lexical items and grammatical structures. Epistemic modality has been studied from many perspectives within linguistics and philosophy. It is one of the most studied phenomena in formal semantics.

Realisation in speech
 (a) grammatically: through 
 modal verbs (e.g., English: may, might, must; : Er soll ein guter Schachspieler sein "He is said to be a good chess player"), 
 particular grammatical moods on verbs, the epistemic moods, or 
 a specific grammatical element, such as an affix (Tuyuca: -hīyi "reasonable to assume") or particle; or
 (b) non-grammatically (often lexically): through 
 adverbials (e.g., English: perhaps, possibly), or 
 through a certain intonational pattern

Non-canonical environments and objective epistemic modality
Lyons 1977 started a long discussion regarding in which environments epistemic modal operators can be embedded and from which environments they are banned. He argues that epistemic modal operators compete for the same position as illocutionary operators, such as the assertion operator, question operator or imperative operator. According to him this explains why most epistemic modals in English are not acceptable embedded under questions or negation.

As Lyons finds single lexemes of epistemic modals in English that are used in questions and under negation, he assumes that they must be part of a separate class of epistemic modality–the so called objective epistemic modality, in contrast to subjective epistemic modality—whose operators are considered to be taking the same position in the clause as illocutionary operators.

Which modal lexemes convey an `objective' epistemic interpretation is subject to much controversy. So far most of the authors who are in favour of a distinct class of objective epistemic modal verbs have not explicitly stated which verbs can be interpreted in an `objective' epistemic way and which can only be interpreted in an `subjective' epistemic way.

It is often assumed that, for languages such as English, Hungarian, Dutch and German, epistemic adverbs only involve a subjective epistemic interpretation and can never be interpreted in an objective epistemic way.

Since the publication of Lyons' work, a range environments have been suggested from which (subjective) epistemic modals are assumed to be banned. Most of these non-canonical environments were motivated by data from English:

No infinitives
No past participles
No past tenses
Excluded from the scope of a counterfactual operator
Excluded from nominalisations
No verbless directional phrase complements
No VP-anaphora
No separation in wh-clefts
May not bear sentence accent
Excluded from the scope of an negation
Excluded from polar questions
Excluded from wh-questions
Excluded from imperatives
Excluded from optatives
Excluded from complement clauses
Excluded from event-related causal clauses
Excluded from the antecedent of an event related conditional clause
Excluded from temporal clauses
Excluded from restrictive relative clauses
Excluded from the scope of a quantifier
No assent/dissent

However, taking a look into languages which have a more productive inflectional morphology such as German, there is solid corpus data that epistemic modal verbs do occur in many of these environments. The only environments in which epistemic modal verbs do not occur in German are as follows.

 they do not occur with verbless directional phrase complements 
 they cannot be separated from their infinitive complements in wh-clefts 
 they do not undergo nominalisations 
 they are exempt from adverbial infinitives
 they cannot be embedded under circumstantial modal verbs 
 they cannot be embedded under predicates of desire 
 they cannot be embedded under imperative operators 
 they cannot be embedded under optative operators

This corpus data further shows that there is no consistent class of objective epistemic modal verbs, neither in English, nor in German. Each of the assumed objective epistemic modals is acceptable in a different range of environments which are actually supposed to hold for the entire stipulated class of objective epistemic modality.

The table below illustrates in which environments the most frequent epistemic modals in German, kann `can', muss `must', dürfte `be.probable', mögen `may' are attested in corpora (yes), or yield ungrammatical judgements (no). The lower part makes reference to classifications by various authors, which of these epistemic modal verb come with an objective epistemic interpretation and which are only restricted to subjective epistemic modality.

Link to evidentiality

Many linguists have considered possible links between epistemic modality and evidentiality, the grammatical marking of a speaker's evidence or information source. However, there is no consensus about what such a link consists of. Some work takes epistemic modality as a starting point and tries to explain evidentiality as a subtype.  Others work in the other direction, attempting to reduce epistemic modality to evidentiality. Still others recognize epistemic modality and evidentiality as two fundamentally separate categories, and posit that particular lexical items may have both an epistemic and an evidential component to their meanings. However, other linguists feel that evidentiality is distinct from and not necessarily related to modality. Some languages mark evidentiality separately from epistemic modality.

See also
 Alethic modality
 Epistemic logic
 Epistemology
 Free choice inference
 Hedge (linguistics)
 Dynamic semantics

Notes

References
 Aikhenvald, Alexandra Y. (2004). Evidentiality. Oxford: Oxford University Press. .
 Aikhenvald, Alexandra Y.; & Dixon, R. M. W. (Eds.). (2003). Studies in evidentiality. Typological studies in language (Vol. 54). Amsterdam: John Benjamins Publishing Company. ; .
 Blakemore, D. (1994). Evidence and modality. In R. E. Asher (Ed.), The Encyclopedia of language and linguistics (pp. 1183–1186). Oxford: Pergamon Press. .
 De Haan, F. (2006). Typological approaches to modality. In W. Frawley (Ed.), The Expression of Modality (pp. 27–69). Berlin: Mouton de Gruyter.
 Diewald, Gabriele. 1999. Die Modalverben im Deutschen: Grammatikalisierung und Polyfunktionalität. Reihe Germanistische Linguistik, No. 208, Tübingen: Niemeyer.
 Hacquard, Valentine and Wellwood, Alexis: Embedding epistemic modals in English. A corpus-based study. In Semantics & Pragmatics 5(4), pp. 1–29 http://dx.doi.org/10.3765/sp.5.4
 Kiefer, Ferenc. 1984. Focus and modality. Groninger Abreiten zur Germanistischen Linguistik 24, 55–81.
 Kiefer, Ferenc. (1986). Epistemic possibility and focus. In W. Abraham & S. de Meij (Eds.), Topic, focus, and configurationality. Amsterdam: Benjamins.
 Kiefer, Ferenc. (1994). Modality. In R. E. Asher (Ed.), The Encyclopedia of language and linguistics (pp. 2515–2520). Oxford: Pergamon Press. .
 Lyons, John. 1977. Semantics, volume 2. Cambridge: Cambridge University Press
 Maché, Jakob 2013:  On Black Magic -- How epistemic modifiers emerge. Phd-Thesis. Freie Universität Berlin.
 Nuyts, J. (2001). Epistemic modality, language, and conceptualization: A cognitive-pragmatic perspective. Amsterdam: John Benjamins Publishing Company.
Nuyts, Jan. 2001b. Subjectivity as an evidential dimension in epistemic modal expression. Journal of Pragmatics 33(3), 383–400.
 Öhlschläger, Günther. 1989. Zur Syntax und Semantik der Modalverben, volume 144 of Linguistische Arbeiten. Tübingen: Niemeyer.
 Palmer, F. R. (1979). Modality and the English modals. London: Longman.
 Palmer, F. R. (1986). Mood and modality. Cambridge: Cambridge University Press. , .
 Palmer, F. R. (2001). Mood and modality (2nd ed.). Cambridge: Cambridge University Press. , .
 Palmer, F. R. (1994). Mood and modality. In R. E. Asher (Ed.), The Encyclopedia of language and linguistics (pp. 2535–2540). Oxford: Pergamon Press.
 Saeed, John I. (2003). Sentence semantics 1: Situations: Modality and evidentiality. In J. I Saeed, Semantics (2nd. ed) (Sec. 5.3, pp. 135–143). Malden, MA: Blackwell Publishing. , .
 Tancredi, Christopher. 2007. A Multi-Model Modal Theory of I-Semantics. Part I: Modals. Ms. University of Tokyo.
 Watts, Richard J. 1984. An analysis of epistemic possibility and probability. English Studies 65(2), 129–140.

External links
 Modality and Evidentiality
 SIL: mood and modality
 SIL: epistemic modality
 SIL: judgment modality: (assumptive mood, declarative mood, deductive mood, dubitative mood, hypothetical mood, interrogative mood, speculative mood)
 SIL: evidentiality
modality in a machine-translation interlingua

Grammar
Grammatical moods
Semantics
Linguistic modality
Formal semantics (natural language)